The National Development Act Repeal Act 1986 was an Act of Parliament in New Zealand that repealed the controversial National Development Act 1979.

See also
Lists of Statutes of New Zealand
Resource Management Act 1991
Environment of New Zealand

External links
Text of the Act

1986 in New Zealand law
Statutes of New Zealand